Dorsen is a surname. Notable people with the surname include:

 Annie Dorsen (born 1973), American theater director
 Norman Dorsen (1930–2017), American attorney, author, and law professor

See also
 Doreen (given name)